Shizhu River is a right-bank tributary of Xiang River in Wangcheng District of Changsha, Hunan Province, China.
 The river has three sources merging into the trunk stream at Daigongqiao. The right branch (northern branch) is its main stream which rises in the Jiufeng Mountain, the headwaters are a group of reservoirs including Chating Reservoir, Sichong Reservoir and Nanchong Reservoir located in Chating Town. The main river runs through Chating and Qiaoyi 2 towns and Tongguan Subdistrict before linking up with the Xiang River. Its drainage basin covers Shizhu, Caitaoyuan, Heqiao, Gguoliang villages of Tongguan Subdistrict, Baishi of Qiaoyi Town, Xihusi, Shiziling, Daigongqiao, Wangqun, Meihualing, Tanjiayuan and Jiufengshan villages of Chating Town.

The source of the main stem of the Shizhu River is Chating Reservoir. Water enters the river through sluice gate. The main stem flows southeast confluence with the middle branch and south branch at Daigongqiao in the eastern side of Hunan provincial route S102．From here the river flows west, after inflowing several streams in Shizhu Batardeau, it joins Xiang River at Lanjiapo Mouth.

References

Rivers of Changsha
Tributaries of the Xiang River